Parchovany is a village and municipality in the Trebišov District in the Košice Region of south-eastern Slovakia.

History
In historical records the village was first mentioned in 1320.

Geography
The village lies at an altitude of 115 metres and covers an area of 23.225 km².
It has a population of about 1,900 people.

Ethnicity
The village is about 89% Slovak and 11% Roma.

Facilities
The village has a public library, a gym and a football pitch. The village has its own birth registry office.

External links
http://www.statistics.sk/mosmis/eng/run.html

Villages and municipalities in Trebišov District